Northwood is a suburb on the northern outskirts of Christchurch city. It was developed in 2000 as a subdivision of Belfast on land previously used for apple orchards. The name "Northwood" was accepted at a meeting of the Shirley-Papanui Community Board on 2 February 2000.

Farmland north-west of what later became Northwood was developed into Peppers Clearwater Resort in 1998.

The Groynes is a large park between Northwood and Clearwater. Styx Mill Conservation Reserve is on the south side of Northwood.

Demographics

Northwood, comprising the statistical areas of Northwood and Clearwater, had a population of 4,266 at the 2018 New Zealand census, an increase of 108 people (2.6%) since the 2013 census, and an increase of 1,293 people (43.5%) since the 2006 census. There were 1,650 households. There were 2,097 males and 2,166 females, giving a sex ratio of 0.97 males per female, with 681 people (16.0%) aged under 15 years, 609 (14.3%) aged 15 to 29, 2,037 (47.7%) aged 30 to 64, and 939 (22.0%) aged 65 or older.

Ethnicities were 83.5% European/Pākehā, 4.6% Māori, 0.8% Pacific peoples, 13.7% Asian, and 2.5% other ethnicities (totals add to more than 100% since people could identify with multiple ethnicities).

The proportion of people born overseas was 24.0%, compared with 27.1% nationally.

Although some people objected to giving their religion, 41.6% had no religion, 48.3% were Christian, 0.8% were Hindu, 1.3% were Muslim, 0.8% were Buddhist and 1.2% had other religions.

Of those at least 15 years old, 882 (24.6%) people had a bachelor or higher degree, and 546 (15.2%) people had no formal qualifications. The employment status of those at least 15 was that 1,701 (47.4%) people were employed full-time, 561 (15.6%) were part-time, and 93 (2.6%) were unemployed.

Northwood Supa Centre

The Northwood Supa Centre shopping complex opened in the 2000s. It covers an area of 33,062 m2 and features 29 retailers, including The Warehouse, Harvey Norman, Countdown, Noel Leeming and Smiths City.

References

Suburbs of Christchurch
Populated places in Canterbury, New Zealand